The 1958 All-Ireland Senior Football Championship was won by Dublin, who beat Derry in the final.  The championship, the premier competition in Gaelic football, is a series of games organised by the Gaelic Athletic Association and played during the summer and early autumn.  A young Martin O'Neill was at the game with his mother, his older brother played in the final.

Louth were the defending champions, however, they were defeated by Dublin in the Leinster final.

Results

Connacht Senior Football Championship

Leinster Senior Football Championship

Munster Senior Football Championship

Ulster Senior Football Championship

An objection was made and a replay ordered

All-Ireland series

Championship statistics

Miscellaneous

 Derry play in their first All Ireland final also win their first Ulster championship final but lose to Dublin.
 There were a number of first-time championship meetings: The Derry/Kerry All Ireland semi-final was their first championship meeting and the All Ireland final was the first championship meeting of Dublin/Derry.

All-Ireland Senior Football Championship